Fedor Ivanovich Madurov (24 April 1942 – 20 February 2022) was a Russian sculptor and graphic artist. He died on February 20, 2022, at the age of 79.

References

1942 births
2022 deaths
Russian male sculptors
Soviet sculptors
People from Chuvashia